Bahner may refer to:

Bahner (surname)
Bahner, Missouri, an unincorporated community in Pettis County, Missouri, US
2358 Bahner, a main-belt asteroid